Partyka is a gender-neutral Slavic surname that may refer to
Artur Partyka (born 1969), Polish high jumper
Elina Partõka (born 1983), Estonian Olympic swimmer
Natalia Partyka (born 1989), Polish table tennis player
Valentyn Partyka (1952–2009), Soviet Olympics swimmer, father of Elina

See also
 

Polish-language surnames